Lorraine Mercer  is a British thalidomide survivor, painter, lace maker, and carriage driver with the RDA.

Mercer was a representative of the global thalidomide community as a bearer of the Olympic Torch in 2012 for her country. Her chariot was adapted to carry the Olympic torch safely above her head away from the oxygen she needs.

In 2015, Mercer received an MBE for community services at the local hospital with the lonely in Mid Sussex.

References 

 

British painters
Living people
Members of the Order of the British Empire
People from Haywards Heath
Year of birth missing (living people)
British people with disabilities